Andrew James Anderson (born March 22, 1994) is an American professional baseball pitcher for the Hiroshima Toyo Carp of Nippon Professional Baseball (NPB). He was drafted by the Philadelphia Phillies  in the 21st round of the 2012 Major League Baseball draft. Anderson made his Major League Baseball (MLB) debut in 2017. He previously played for the Philadelphia Phillies, Chicago White Sox, and Texas Rangers.

Career
Anderson was born in Reno, Nevada, and attended Galena High School in Reno.

Philadelphia Phillies
He was drafted by the Philadelphia Phillies in the 21st round of the 2012 Major League Baseball Draft. In 2013, he was an MiLB Philadelphia Phillies Organization All Star, as pitching for Williamsport he was 6–3	with a 2.00 ERA in 15 starts. He missed the 2015 season recovering from Tommy John surgery, that April 2. In 2016 pitching for Lakewood and Clearwater he was 3–4 with a 2.70 ERA in 15 starts.

The Phillies added him to their 40-man roster after the 2016 season. In 2017 as he played for Reading, he was the Eastern League Pitcher of the Week on both May 14 and June 4, and was an Eastern League Mid-Season All Star.

Anderson received his MLB call-up on August 1, 2017, to fill the open roster spot after the Phillies traded away Joaquín Benoit. After making his debut that day (on the road, against the Angels), he was optioned back to the AA Reading Fightin Phils the very next day. He appeared in one more major league game that season, August 26, at home against the Cubs. Over his two 2017 Phillies appearances, he pitched a total of 2.1 innings and allowed 6 earned runs. Pitching for Reading and the Lehigh Valley IronPigs, he was 9–4 with a 3.46 ERA in 22 starts.

In 2018 with the Phillies, he was 0–1 with a 4.97 ERA, and 11 strikeouts in 12.2 innings pitched. Pitching for the Lehigh Valley IronPigs he was 9–4 with a 3.87 ERA in 19 starts.

Anderson had a strong spring training with the Phillies in 2019, pitching to a 0.71 ERA in four starts. However, he did not make the team's Opening Day roster, and then struggled in AAA with the Lehigh Valley IronPigs before being designated for assignment on September 1 and released the following day. With Lehigh Valley in 2019 he was 0–6	with a 5.77 ERA in 11 starts (48.1 innings), and he pitched six innings with the Phillies in which he gave up five runs.

Chicago White Sox
On January 21, 2020, Anderson signed a minor league deal with the Chicago White Sox. On August 8, 2020, his contract was purchased and he was called up to the major leagues. He made his team debut that same day, allowing four runs over 1.1 innings pitched in relief. Anderson was designated for assignment on August 9. Anderson was released by the White Sox on September 3, 2020.

Texas Rangers
On January 5, 2021, Anderson signed a minor league contract with the Texas Rangers organization. On July 30, Texas selected Anderson's contract and promoted him to the active roster.
Anderson made 9 appearances for Texas in 2021, going 1–1 with a 3.27 ERA and 9 strikeouts. On October 30, Anderson was released by the Rangers so he could pursue an opportunity in Asia.

Hiroshima Toyo Carp
On November 3, 2021, Anderson signed a $700K contract with the Hiroshima Toyo Carp of Nippon Professional Baseball.

References

External links

1994 births
Living people
Sportspeople from Reno, Nevada
Baseball players from Nevada
Major League Baseball pitchers
Philadelphia Phillies players
Chicago White Sox players
Texas Rangers players
Florida Complex League Phillies players
Williamsport Crosscutters players
Lakewood BlueClaws players
Clearwater Threshers players
Reading Fightin Phils players
Lehigh Valley IronPigs players
Round Rock Express players
Melbourne Aces players
American expatriate baseball players in Australia
Hiroshima Toyo Carp players
Nippon Professional Baseball pitchers